Sexey's School is a Church of England, co-educational state boarding and day school in Bruton, Somerset, England for 11-18 year olds. Sexey's School is named after Hugh Sexey who, in 1599, was appointed as a Royal auditor to Elizabeth I and later as a Royal auditor to James I. Sexey's Hospital was established in 1619 from the proceeds of his will, and the school was founded in 1889. State boarding schools are most unusual in England and Wales. The school became an academy in August 2011.

History 
Sexey's School dates back to a trade school which opened on 6 April 1891 with 15 boys. The first Head Master was William Albert Knight. The Head Master and the boys moved into temporary premises in a house known as 'The Glen' on Quaperlake Street in Bruton. At the end of its first year there were 40 boys at the school learning basic subjects including practical mechanics, land measuring and elementary science. The school was moved to its current site in 1892 in new buildings designed by Norwich-based architect George Skipper. The new buildings were formally opened on 19 April 1892.

As headmaster, William A. Knight emphasized science. His students include the outstanding British biologists, L. J. F. Brimble, Frederick Tom Brooks, Ralph Warren Marsh, and Walter Cecil Moore.

Sexey's was a grammar school until the Education Act 1944, after which it became a Voluntary Controlled school. In 1991 it adopted Grant Maintained status and in September 1999 it became a Voluntary Aided school.

It remained an all-boys school until 1977 when it became fully co-educational. Boarding facilities were expanded in the 1980s with the building of two new boarding houses – Lisbury House and Coombe House – making Sexey's one of the largest schools of its type in the country. The school has continued expansion with the introduction of a policy in 2003 to take day pupils from a local catchment area of 1.5 miles. Prior to this the last day pupil was admitted in 1983. In 2001 the school had 394 pupils. In 2007 there were 512 pupils.

As a state boarding (and day) school, Sexey's has complex funding arrangements with both state (government funded) and independent income (for the boarding facilities).

In 2013 the then Secretary of State for Education, Michael Gove, described Sexey's as "one of the most outstanding schools in the country," during an interview on the Andrew Marr Show on BBC One.

In 2019 two catering managers were convicted of defrauding the school of over £16,000.

In 2019, after a number of poor Ofsted results and on the recommendation of the Regional Schools Commissioner, the school considered merging into the Sherborne Area Schools' Trust multi-academy trust. But following extensive parental engagement by Sexey's parents, governors and government representatives who were in opposition to the move, the Sherborne Trust decided not to proceed, stating there was "not an alignment of values or partnership working with Sexey's". The Regional Schools Commissioner considered what the next step should be. Ofsted inspection visits in 2020 and 2021 found that leaders and those responsible for governance were taking effective remedial action.

Boarding
Around one fifth of the school are boarders. There are two boarding houses:
 Macmillan House, Opened 2011, is a new £3.5 m installation replacing Walwin House. Its name is a tribute to Douglas MacMillan who was an old boy of the school (Old Sexeian) and founded MacMillan Cancer Support.
 Coombe House, opened 1983. Coombe has capacity for around 100 boarders in all year groups.
Former boarding houses include:
 Walwin House (formerly Junior House) was two houses built in the late 1930s. Walwin House used to accommodate year 7 boarders and had the capacity for 49 children  – 30 boys and 19 girls.
 Cliff House, a Grade II listed building built by Thomas Hannam in 1820 opened as a boarding house in 1892. It used to takes boarders in all year groups but is now used for teaching and holiday lets.
 Lisbury House, opened 1983, is currently undergoing renovation.

Headteachers
William Albert Knight (1891–1927)
Wallace E. Page (1927–1955)
William R. Towns (1955–1965)
Norman S. Roberts (1965–1970)
David Curtis (1970–1980)
John Lello (1980–1989)
David Charman (1989–1995)
Stephen Burgoyne (1995–2007)
Raymond McGovern (2008–2013)
Jean Hopegood (Acting Head) 2013
Irfan Latif (2013–2017)
Gill Kelly (Interim Head) (2017–2018)
Helen Cullen (2018–

School song
The school song is a devotional chorus.
Hear mighty Lord,
Thy Sexeian's humble cry:
Hear, mighty Lord.
Inspire with motives high
For work and School.
For students here and past
Grant thankfulness,
And endless rest at last.

2002 calendar
In 2001, a group of pupils produced a glossy calendar as part of a Young Enterprise business project, sold for charity, called "Sexey's Hot Twelve", that featured 12 pictures of boys and girls in seductive poses. Child protection groups criticised the calendar for its potential attraction to adults who prey on vulnerable young people. The school reported that they had received no complaints, and that most of the 500 copies were bought immediately after going on sale.

Notable former pupils
Craig Alcock, professional footballer
L. J. F. Brimble, botanist and editor of Nature magazine
Frederick Tom Brooks FRS, botanist, Professor of Botany, Cambridge University, attended 1895–1898
John Bryant, Journalist (Editor in Chief of the Telegraph titles) and marathon runner
 Tim Burt, British geographer and Master of Hatfield College, Durham
Gilbert Gabriel, musician and member of The Dream Academy
Lucy Giles, first female college commander at the Royal Military Academy Sandhurst
Brian Gomm, amateur cricketer and footballer
Douglas Macmillan, founder of Macmillan Cancer Support.
Hubert Phillips, economist, broadcaster, journalist, author, bridge player and organiser
Professor Sir David John Read FRS, biologist, Vice President and Biological Secretary of the Royal Society
Sir Harold Richard Scott, Commissioner of the Metropolitan Police, 1945–1953
 Ned Sherrin, broadcaster, author and stage director, 1931–2007
Alex Tew, creator of Million Dollar Homepage
Nigel Vincent FBA, linguist and academic
Arthur Willis, botanist and editor

Notable former staff
Charles Edward Moss, botanist, science master at Sexey's in 1901

References

External links
 Official site
 The Association of Old Sexeians

Boarding schools in Somerset
Secondary schools in Somerset
Educational institutions established in 1889
1889 establishments in England
Academies in Somerset
Church of England secondary schools in the Diocese of Bath and Wells
Bruton
 
State funded boarding schools in England